Antonio Varas de la Barra (June 13, 1817 – June 5, 1886) was a Chilean political figure. He began his political career as a Conservative, but was later a member of the National Party, of which he was one of the founders in 1857. He served several times as minister.

Antonio Varas was born in Cauquenes, the son of Miguel Varas Vallejo and of Agustina de la Barra Alarcón. Because his father was a royalist supporter, after independence all the family properties were confiscated, leaving them in the most complete destitution. Thanks to his brother José Miguel, he was able to complete his studies at the Instituto Nacional, where he met and befriended Manuel Montt and Buonaventura Cousiño, both of whom were his teachers. In time he became, first, philosophy teacher, later vice-principal and finally principal of that institute. During his tenure, he substantially improved the quality of education offered at that, the principal school in the country.

He started his political career when elected deputy for Chillán in 1842. He was later elected deputy for Cauquenes in 1846, and for Curicó in 1852. Varas was named Minister of the Interior and Foreign Affairs by President Manuel Bulnes, a position he retained under President Manuel Montt. During that administration, he was also Minister of Justice, Cult and Public Instruction, Minister of the Treasury and Minister of War and Navy.  In 1858 was elected deputy for Talca and later for Cauquenes again. In 1864 was elected deputy for Santiago, in 1867 for Elqui and in 1873 for Talca. In 1876 was elected senator for Talca, in 1879 for Coquimbo and reelected for the same in 1882, position he held until his death. He was elected President of the Senate of Chile in 1882. Varas died in Santiago, at the age of 69. The city of Puerto Varas is named after him.

References

External links

Official biographical sketch 

1817 births
1886 deaths
People from Cauquenes
Chilean people of Spanish descent
Conservative Party (Chile) politicians
National Party (Chile, 1857) politicians
Chilean Ministers of Justice
Chilean Ministers of the Interior
Presidents of the Senate of Chile
Members of the Chamber of Deputies of Chile
Instituto Nacional General José Miguel Carrera alumni